Amiran Shkalim (born 23 March 1988) is an Israeli retired footballer.

Notes

1988 births
Living people
Israeli footballers
Maccabi Tel Aviv F.C. players
Hapoel Kfar Saba F.C. players
Hapoel Petah Tikva F.C. players
Hapoel Rishon LeZion F.C. players
F.C. Ashdod players
Hapoel Nir Ramat HaSharon F.C. players
Hapoel Tel Aviv F.C. players
Liga Leumit players
Israeli Premier League players
Footballers from Ramat HaSharon
Israeli people of Iranian-Jewish descent
Association football defenders